Geison Rodrigues Marrote or simply Geison  (born April 28, 1987 in Porto Alegre), is a Brazilian striker. He currently plays for Brasil de Farroupilha.

External links
 CBF
 zerozero.pt

1987 births
Living people
Brazilian footballers
Esporte Clube Juventude players
Grêmio Foot-Ball Porto Alegrense players
Association football forwards
Footballers from Porto Alegre